Katsiaryna Barazna (born ) is a Belarusian female  track cyclist. She competed in the omnium and scratch events at the 2014 UCI Track Cycling World Championships.

Career results
2012
3rd Scratch Race, UEC European U23 Track Championships

References

External links
 Profile at cyclingarchives.com

1990 births
Living people
Belarusian track cyclists
Belarusian female cyclists
Place of birth missing (living people)